Bishop Carroll High School may refer to one of the following Catholic high schools:

Bishop Carroll High School (Calgary, Alberta) in Calgary, Alberta, Canada
Bishop Carroll High School (Ebensburg, Pennsylvania) in Ebensburg, Pennsylvania, USA
Bishop Carroll Catholic High School (Wichita, Kansas) in Wichita, Kansas, USA

The acronym BCHS might also refer to:

Baruch College Campus High School in New York, New York, USA

See also

BCHS (disambiguation)